is a 2006 Japanese novel by Shion Miura.  The novel has received a manga and a live-action film adaptation, as well as an anime television series adaptation by Production I.G that aired from October 2, 2018 to March 26, 2019.

Synopsis
Kakeru, a former elite runner at high school, is chased for stealing food. He is saved by a Kansei University student named Haiji, who is also a runner. Haiji persuades Kakeru to live in the old dormitory "Chikusei-so" where he plans to team up with fellow residents to enter the Hakone Ekiden relay marathon, one of the most prominent university races in Japan. Kakeru soon finds out that all of the residents except for Haiji and himself are complete novices.

Characters

Kakeru is a 1st year sociology student at Kansei University Student and an experienced runner. A prodigious athlete since high school, he became disillusioned due to an incident on his old Track and Field team. He first joined Chikusei-so after Haiji meets him stealing from a convenience store. Over the course of the story, Kakeru learns the meaning of running together with others. 

Haiji is a 4th year Kansei University Student and a long time resident of Chikusei-so. He has dreams of running in the Hakone Ekiden with a team and slowly built up one of at-first unwilling acquaintances at the dorm. Despite recovering from a knee injury, Haiji remains one of the most enthusiastic residents and coach of the group. 

Known as 'Shindo' to the other members of the dorm. Generally considered an honor student by the other residents of Chikusei-so, Takashi is an earnest student from the mountain regions. He was the first convinced by Haiji to give running a chance and has been a significant driving force behind the others. His dedication towards training originally stemmed from wanting to inspire and impress his family, but eventually became something entirely his own. 

Nicknamed 'Prince' by the other dorm members, Akane is a manga enthusiast with his room filled to the brim with various volumes. He began as one of the most reluctant and slowest members due to his lack of physical stamina and indoor tendencies. Akane picked up his training after Takashi had his family send over a treadmill for him to remain indoors to read manga. After finding true inspiration from his friends at Chikusei-so and Kakeru's presence, he pushes himself beyond his limitations. 

The older of the Jō twins. He goes by Jota and is nearly indistinguishable from his younger brother. The two think and act in tandem. Though he was originally driven by the intention to attract girls through running, Jota came to appreciate the sport. 

The younger of the Jō twins. He goes by Joji and appears almost the exact same as his elder brother. Originally intending to run for the sake of becoming popular with girls, he realize that running was something enjoyable in itself. 

Known as 'Yuki' by the other members of Chikusei-so, he passed the bar examination on his first try. Yuki was initially reluctant to run and was bent on defying Haiji's enthusiasm, but eventually got drawn into it as the others members did. He hates the smell of tobacco coming from Akihiro's smoking until he quit for running.  

Musa is a native to Tanzania. He moved to Japan to study Space and Engineering as a sponsored international student at Kansei University. His Japanese still has flaws leading to some misunderstandings and written mistakes. Kind and earnest, Musa is always supportive of his other team members and is well known by the residents of the local shopping district. 

Known as 'King' due to his love of trivia, Yohei is a 4th year Sociology student at Kansei University. Besides his nightly trivia marathons, he's generally preoccupied by job hunting to no avail. Yohei eventually relented and joined in the team's efforts due to the earnest words of Takashi. 

Known as 'Nico-senpai' due to his habit of smoking. Prior to entering Kansei University, he ran Track during high school but quit due to his coach. As Akihiro picked up running again under Haiji's influence, he stopped smoking and began to make small metallic figures as a substitute.  

Known as Hana-chan to the members of Chikusei-so, she is a 3rd year high school student and daughter of one of the shop owners in the local shopping district. At Haiji's request, Hanako rode her bike alongside the team and also times their runs. She's become well known for her terrible cooking. 

Sakaki was a member of Kakeru's high school Track and Field team. He developed an eternal grudge towards Kakeru after causing an incident that affected their entire team. 

Kazuma is a running prodigy and famous among intercollegiate track meets and races. He knew Haiji prior to his knee injury and becomes a target for Kakeru to defeat.

Genichiro is the landlord of Chikusei-so and the official coach of the team. However, he leaves most of the work to Haiji and his enthusiasm.

Media

Novel
The novel was written by Shion Miura, and Shinchosha published it on September 22, 2006.  Shinchosha published a second edition of the novel on July 1, 2009.

Manga
A manga adaptation by Sorata Unno launched in Shueisha's seinen manga magazine Weekly Young Jump on October 18, 2007. It moved to Monthly Young Jump in 2008, where it ran until November 17, 2009.

Live-action film
A live-action film adaptation premiered in October 2009.

Anime
An anime television series adaptation premiered from October 2, 2018 to March 26, 2019, and was broadcast on NTV, SDT, YTV and BS-NTV. The series is directed by Kazuya Nomura and written by Kohei Kiyasu, with animation by Production I.G.  The series' character designs are provided by Takahiro Chiba and the music is composed by Yuki Hayashi. It aired for 23 episodes, and Crunchyroll simulcasted the series. The series is licensed by Sentai Filmworks for streaming and home video release.

An English dub of the series was confirmed by Sentai on November 16, 2019.

Music

In the first half of the anime, the opening theme song is "Catch Up, Latency" by Unison Square Garden and the ending theme song is "Reset" by Taichi Mukai. In the second half of the anime, the opening theme song is "Kaze Tsuyoku, Kimi Atsuku" by Q-MHz and Sky-Hi, and the ending theme song is "Michi" by Taichi Mukai.

The anime series' soundtrack is composed by Yuki Hayashi. A two-disc soundtrack album published by Toho Animation Records was released on December 19, 2018 with a total of 51 tracks.

Notes

References

External links
  
 

2000s Japanese films
2006 Japanese novels
2009 films
Anime and manga based on novels
Production I.G
Seinen manga
Sentai Filmworks
Shinchosha books
Shueisha franchises
Shueisha manga
Toho Animation